Nonconnah, Tennessee was a populated place along Nonconnah Creek in what is now Memphis.

Nonconnah was located just to the east of West Junction, Tennessee.

Sources
Google maps map for Nonconnah
2009 Rand McNally Road Atlas, p. 94
Encyclopædia Britannica Atlas, 1958 Edition, Plate 111.

Geography of Shelby County, Tennessee
Former populated places in Tennessee